The Northern Asia-Pacific Division (NSD) of Seventh-day Adventists is a sub-entity of the General Conference of Seventh-day Adventists, which oversees the Church's work in portions of Northern Asia, which includes the nations of Japan, Mongolia, North Korea, South Korea, and Taiwan.  Its headquarters is in Goyang City, South Korea. Founded in 1919 as the Far Eastern Division. The Division membership as of June 30, 2021 is 285,242.

Sub Fields

The Northern Asia-Pacific is divided into two Union Conferences, one attached Conference and one attached Mission. These are divided into local Conferences and Missions.

 Japan Union Conference 
 East Japan Conference
 Okinawa Mission
 West Japan Conference
 Korean Union Conference 
 East Central Korean Conference 
 Jeju Region 
 Middlewest Korean Conference 
 North Korean Mission
 Southeast Korean Conference 
 Southwest Korean Conference 
 West Central Korean Conference 
 Mongolia Mission 
 Taiwan Conference

History

See also
Seventh-day Adventist Church in the People's Republic of China
Seventh-day Adventist Church in Sichuan
Seventh-day Adventist Church
List of Seventh-day Adventist hospitals
List of Seventh-day Adventist secondary schools
List of Seventh-day Adventist colleges and universities

References

External links

Adventist organizations established in the 20th century
Seventh-day Adventist Church in Asia